Shedd Brook is an  stream located in southern New Hampshire in the United States. It is a tributary of Beards Brook, part of the Contoocook River and Merrimack River watersheds.

Shedd Brook begins at the north outlet of Highland Lake in Washington, New Hampshire.  The brook flows east, crossing the small town of Windsor and entering Hillsborough. Hillsborough Upper Village is located where Black Pond Brook descends over falls to join Shedd Brook, which ends two miles downstream at Beards Brook.

New Hampshire Route 31 follows Shedd Brook in Washington and Windsor.

See also

List of rivers of New Hampshire

References

Tributaries of the Merrimack River
Rivers of New Hampshire
Rivers of Hillsborough County, New Hampshire
Rivers of Sullivan County, New Hampshire